Satu Mare is a commune located in Suceava County, Bukovina, Romania. It is composed of two villages, Satu Mare and Țibeni.

From 1776 to 1941, Țibeni village was inhabited by the Székelys of Bukovina.

Lázár Lovász, the Olympic bronze medal-winning hammer thrower, was born in Țibeni.

References

External links

Communes in Suceava County
Localities in Southern Bukovina
Duchy of Bukovina